Carter Cornelius (October 5, 1948 – November 7, 1991) was an American R&B musician. He was later known as Prince Gideon Israel.

Career

Band 
A native of Dania Beach, Florida, Cornelius was part of the musical group Cornelius Brothers & Sister Rose. A family-oriented musical group, the band was formed in 1971, in Dania, Florida, with Carter, his brother Eddie, and his sisters Billie Jo, and Rose.

Recordings 
Cornelius Brothers & Sister Rose released their self-titled album on the United Artists LP soon after forming. The album went to #29 on the LP Pop Chart and was a minor hit. The group also scored successes with the recordings "Treat Her Like A Lady", "Too Late To Turn Back Now", and "Don't Ever Be Lonely (A Poor Little Fool Like Me)." The release of "Don't Ever Be Lonely (A Poor Little Fool Like Me)", was the group's last hit. Carter Cornelius died on November 7, 1991, at the age of 43.

Other recordings by this group include, "I Just Can't Stop Loving Her", "Let Me Down Easy", "I'm So Glad (To Be Loved By You)", "Good Loving Don't Come Easy", "Got To Testify (Love)", "Big Time Lover", "I Keep Falling Deeper And Deeper", and "I'm Never Gonna Be Alone Anymore."

Prince Gideon 
In 1976 he went into seclusion with Yahweh Ben Yahweh, founder of the Miami religious sect the Nation of Yahweh, whose followers adopt the surname Israel. He built a recording studio where he wrote, recorded and mixed the sect's music and videos, and he was working on a comeback song at the time of his death of a heart attack, said his sister, Billie Bain, of Dania Beach.
He was 43 years of age when he died.

Solo releases

7" singles 
 "He's Alright With Me" / "He's Alright With Me" Hangar 18 HLYFLA777 – 1988 
 "It's Your Fault" / "YBY" – Hangar 18 H-18-HLYFLA-3007 – 1988 
 "Smooth Sailing" / "Smooth Sailing (Cruising)" – Hanger 18 – H-18-HLYFLA SM-777 – 1990 
 "Imagination" / "Imagination (Instrumental)" – Hangar 18 – H-18-HLY FLA IM-77 – 1991

Albums 
 Love Train – Hangar 18 Records – 1988
 Smooth Sailing – Hangar 18 Records – 1990

References 

1948 births
1991 deaths
American rhythm and blues musicians
20th-century American musicians
People from Dania Beach, Florida
20th-century African-American musicians